Edano (written: 枝野) is a Japanese surname. Notable people with the surname include:

, Japanese table tennis player
 (born 1964), Japanese politician

Japanese-language surnames